Alternanthera littoralis is an African species of plant in the family Amaranthaceae. The leaves are eaten as a vegetable.

References

External links
PROTAbase on Alternanthera littoralis

littoralis